Collegeville Township is a township in Stearns County, Minnesota, United States. The population was 3,343 at the 2010 census.

History
Collegeville Township was organized in 1880, and named after Saint John's College.

Geography

Collegeville Township is located in Township 124 North of the Arkansas Base Line and Range 30 West of the 5th Principal Meridian.

Demographics

As of the census of 2000, there were 3,516 people, 29% of those being Monks at the present Abbey and Monastery. 569 households, and 397 families residing in the township.  The population density was 111.1 people per square mile (42.9/km).  There were 721 housing units at an average density of 22.8/sq mi (8.8/km).  The racial makeup of the township was 97.07% White, 0.63% African American, 0.06% Native American, 1.56% Asian, 0.03% Pacific Islander, 0.34% from other races, and 0.31% from two or more races. Hispanics and Latinos of any race were 0.85% of the population.

There were 669 households, out of which 39.6% had children under the age of 18 living with them, 78.0% were married couples living together, 2.7% had a female householder with no husband present, and 16.4% were non-families. 12.3% of all households were made up of individuals, and 2.4% had someone living alone who was 65 years of age or older.  The average household size was 2.85 and the average family size was 3.11.

The age distribution was 16.7% under the age of 18, 41.6% from 18 to 24, 16.8% from 25 to 44, 18.2% from 45 to 64, and 6.6% who were 65 years of age or older.  The median age was 22 years. For every 100 females, there were 261.0 males.  For every 100 females age 18 and over, there were 320.8 males.

The median income for a household in the township was $61,146, and the median income for a family was $62,750. Males had a median income of $36,926 versus $27,391 for females. The per capita income for the township was $18,348.  About 0.6% of families and 6.0% of the population were below the poverty line, including 1.1% of those under age 18 and 2.3% of those age 65 or over.

Arts and culture

Museums and other points of interest
 Saint John's Arboretum
 Saint John's University
Saint John's Abbey

Education
The township is home to Saint John's Abbey and Saint John's University, a Catholic school all-male university.

Infrastructure

Transportation 
Main routes in the community include  Stearns County Roads 50, 51, 159 and 160.

Notable people

Fr.Celestine Kapsner, OSB, Catholic priest and exorcist
J. F. Powers, National Book Award for Fiction-winning novelist
Marcel Breuer, a famous Architect from New York, here to design the new St. John's Abbey and University Church.

References

External links
 
 Collegeville Township Minnesota Website
 City-Data.com
 St. John's University
 St. John's Arboretum

Townships in Stearns County, Minnesota
St. Cloud, Minnesota metropolitan area
Townships in Minnesota